Cheung Chi Yip (born December 26, 1986, in Hong Kong) is a Hong Konger judoka. He competed in the men's 73 kg event at the 2012 Summer Olympics and was eliminated in the second round by Nicholas Delpopolo.

References

1986 births
Living people
Hong Kong male judoka
Olympic judoka of Hong Kong
Judoka at the 2012 Summer Olympics
Judoka at the 2006 Asian Games
Judoka at the 2010 Asian Games
Judoka at the 2014 Asian Games
Asian Games competitors for Hong Kong